Blood of Minas Gerais (Portuguese: Sangue Mineiro) is a 1930 Brazilian silent drama film directed by Humberto Mauro. The film is set around Belo Horizonte, where it was filmed. It was Mauro's final film for the small Phebo Filme company before he moved to the much better funded Cinédia studio in Rio de Janeiro.

Synopsis
The daughter of a millionaire attempts to commit suicide after being spurned by her lover.

Cast
 Maury Bueno as Christovam  
 Ernani de Paula  
 Pedro Fantol as Juliano Sampaio  
 Rosendo Franco as Franco  
 Adhemar Gonzaga as Carmem's Father 
 Luiz Guimarães
 Augusta Leal as Aunt Marta  
 Humberto Mauro as Farmer's servant 
 Nita Ney as Neusa  
 Carmen Santos as Carmem 
 Máximo Serrano as Máximo  
 Elie Sone as Tuty  
 Luis Soroa as Roberto

References

Bibliography
 Shaw, Lisa & Dennison, Stephanie. Brazilian National Cinema. Routledge, 2014.

External links
 

1930 drama films
1930 films
Brazilian drama films
Brazilian silent feature films
Brazilian black-and-white films
Films directed by Humberto Mauro
Films set in Brazil
1930s Portuguese-language films
Silent drama films